Fountains Fell Tarn, is an upland lake between the two peaks of Fountains Fell, in North Yorkshire, England. Water from the tarn flows eastwards through Cowside Beck, which is a tributary of the River Skirfare in Littondale. Whilst the water in the lake is acidic, as it runs off the mountain, it flows over Yoredale beds limestone and so becomes a harder (more alkaline) water.

Description
Fountains Fell Tarn occupies a shallow basin created by glacial activity in the Devensian age, which scoured the limestone away. Malham Tarn was created in a similar fashion with the removal of the porous limestone allowing water to collect. Although the tarn does not have a permanent outflow (the inflow of water almost matching that of the evaporation), in times of heavy precipitation, water from the tarn drains eastwards as Cowside Beck, an affluent of the River Skirfare in Littondale. The water at the tarn site is mostly unaffected by limestone, being quite acidic from the local peat, and the underlying rock of millstone grit, instead of limestone, which results in the water having a hardness value of between 3–5. However, the underlying rocks which the water drains across are limestone of the Yoredale beds and Great Scar limestone, from which the water absorbs alkalinity, so by the time it reaches the water draining off Darnbrook Fell, its hardness is rated somewhere between 19 and 25. 

The tarn lies fairly shallow on a flat plateau among the eroding peat bog (which supplies its acidity). The bottom of the tarn was recorded in the 1950s as being largely composed of sand with some peat encroachment.

It is often frozen for long periods of time during the winter due to its height near the summit of Fountains Fell.

Water bugs and water beetles were found to be present in the tarn, but freshwater shrimp (gammarus pulex) was absent. This was attributed to the low calcium levels in the tarn, as the species was abundant in the streams and becks draining from it.

The tarn is accessible from the Pennine Way, which runs across Fountains Fell to the east of the tarn.

Water pH values

Fountains Fell Tarn's inflow is precipitation, whereas, most of the water in Malham Tarn has arrived from streams and becks which flow over limestone, accruing alkalinity as it travels over the bedrock.

Naming
The tarn is named after the mountain it is located on; Fountains Fell. This was first recorded as Fountains Fell in 1540, named after Fountains Abbey who owned the sheep pasture rights on the mountain. The first written record of the name Fountains Fell Tarn, was in 1858, with the word tarn, a commonplace name for upland lakes, deriving from the Old Scandinavian tjǫrn. On the road through Silverdale, between Pen-y-ghent and Fountains Fell, to Halton Gill, lies the Ulfkil Cross base. The cross records the boundary between Stainforth and Malham Moors townships, and in written records lists the mountain (Fountains Fell as Gnup) and the tarn as Suartecumbe.

Sometimes the lake is recorded as Fountains Tarn.

See also
List of lakes and tarns in North Yorkshire

Notes

References

Sources

External links
Profile of the tarn on My Yorkshire Dales

Glacial lakes
Lakes of North Yorkshire